Matěj Blümel (born 31 May 2000) is a Czech professional ice hockey forward for the Texas Stars in the American Hockey League (AHL) as a prospect to the Dallas Stars of the National Hockey League (NHL) and the Czech national team.

Playing career
Blümel as a youth began his career within HC Dynamo Pardubice, joining the club as a 13 year-old and featuring through all junior levels. He spent to two junior season in North America, playing with the Waterloo Black Hawks in the United States Hockey League (USHL) before he was drafted by the Edmonton Oilers in the fourth-round, 100th overall, of the 2019 NHL Entry Draft.

Blümel returned to the Czech Republic and made his professional debut with Dynamo Pardubice during the 2019–20 season. In a depth role, he continued his development in recording 4 goals through 31 regular season games.

Following his third full season in the ELH, and with his draft rights not retained by the Oilers, Blümel was signed as a free agent to a two-year, entry-level contract with the Dallas Stars on 7 June 2022.

Blümel scored his first career NHL goal against the Philadelphia Flyers on November 13th 2022.

International play

Blümel represented the Czech Republic at the 2021 IIHF World Championship, collecting 1 goal in 5 games to help Czechia finish in 7th place.

He returned with the Czech Republic in the following 2022 IIHF World Championship hosted in Finland, and produced four goals and 8 points through 10 games to help Czechia claim their first medal in 10 years in capturing the bronze.

Career statistics

Regular season and playoffs

International

References

External links

2000 births
Living people
Czech expatriate ice hockey people
Czech expatriate ice hockey players in the United States
Czech ice hockey left wingers
Czech ice hockey right wingers
Dallas Stars players
Edmonton Oilers draft picks
HC Dynamo Pardubice players
People from Tábor
Sportspeople from the South Bohemian Region
Texas Stars players
Waterloo Black Hawks players